Almost a Honeymoon is a 1938 British comedy film directed by Norman Lee and starring Tommy Trinder, Linden Travers and Edmund Breon. It was based on the 1930 play Almost a Honeymoon by Walter Ellis, previously filmed in 1930. Its plot is about a young man who urgently needs to find a wife so that he can get a lucrative job in the colonial service, and sets out to persuade a woman to marry him.

It was shot at the Welwyn Studios of Associated British outside London. The film's sets were designed by the art director Duncan Sutherland.

Cast
 Tommy Trinder as Peter Dibley
 Linden Travers as Patricia Quilter
 Edmund Breon as Aubrey Lovitt
 Frederick Burtwell as Charles
 Vivienne Bennett as Rita Brent
 Arthur Hambling as Adolphus
 Aubrey Mallalieu as Clutterbuck
 Ian Fleming as Sir James Hooper
 Betty Jardine as Lavinia Pepper
 Wally Patch as Bailiff

Critical reception
Allmovie wrote, "nothing really happens (this is a 1938 film), but you can't censor the gleam in the supporting characters' eyes."

References

External links

1938 films
1938 comedy films
1930s English-language films
Films directed by Norman Lee
British comedy films
British films based on plays
British black-and-white films
1930s British films